This is a complete listing of National Basketball Association players who have scored 50 or more points in a playoff game.

This feat has only been accomplished 43 times in NBA playoff history by 28 players. Only seven players have scored 50 or more points on more than one occasion: Michael Jordan (eight times), Wilt Chamberlain (four times), Allen Iverson (three times), Jerry West (twice), Donovan Mitchell (twice), Jamal Murray (twice), and Damian Lillard (twice). Rick Barry scored the last 2 of his 3 50+ point playoff games in the American Basketball Association (ABA).

Out of those 43 times, 16 times the player earned themselves a Double-double, which is having double digits in 2 statistical categories. It has been points and rebounds 13 times, and points and assists the other three. This feat has been done by 14 different players, and only Wilt Chamberlain has done it more than once. Those players (in order of most points scored) are Elgin Baylor, Wilt Chamberlain (4 times), Charles Barkley, Rick Barry, Damian Lillard, Jerry West, Eric "Sleepy" Floyd, Bob Pettit, Billy Cunningham, Bob McAdoo, Karl Malone, Dirk Nowitzki, Jamal Murray, and Giannis Antetokounmpo.

The only player who has earned a 50+ point triple-double in a playoff game is Russell Westbrook, who dropped 51 while grabbing 10 rebounds and dealing out 13 assists.

Out of the 28, only 4 players to accomplish this feat were born out of the United States. Those players are Dominique Wilkins (France), Dirk Nowitzki (Germany), Jamal Murray (Canada), and Giannis Antetokounmpo (Greece).

Only four players have scored 50 or more points more than once in the same series: Michael Jordan (vs Cleveland, 1988), Allen Iverson (vs Toronto, 2001), Donovan Mitchell (vs Denver, 2020), and Jamal Murray (vs Utah, 2020).

Only once in NBA playoff history have two players scored 50 or more points in the same game. Donovan Mitchell of the Utah Jazz and Jamal Murray of the Denver Nuggets scored 51 and 50 points respectively on August 23, 2020.

With Jamal Murray’s 50 on August 30, 2020, he and Donovan Mitchell became the first pair of players to have multiple 50 point games in the same playoff series.

Jordan has 5 of the 10 highest scoring playoff games in history.

Key

Single-game leaders

See also 
 List of National Basketball Association single-game scoring leaders

Notes

References 

National Basketball Association lists
Players with 50 or more points in a playoff game
National Basketball Association statistical leaders